Islamberg is a rural hamlet and religious community in the town of Tompkins, Delaware County, New York, United States.

History
Islamberg was settled by a group of mostly black Muslim families in the 1980s, who sought to escape the troubles of New York City. The group was inspired by Sufi Cleric Sheikh Syed Mubarik Ali Shah Gilani and sought a more "peaceful and holy Muslim life". Islamberg has a population of about 200, along with its own grocery store, bookstore, and school. The community serves as the headquarters of Muslims of America, which seeks to promote an understanding of Islam.

Public safety

Although relations with neighboring communities are cooperative, Islamberg has repeatedly faced threats and persecution originating from false right-wing conspiracy theories spread online. Right-wing groups, such as Info Wars, have claimed that Islamberg is a training center for terrorists, claims which local law enforcement and state police investigators say are untrue.

In November 2015, Jon Ritzheimer, of Phoenix, Arizona, made news for threatening an attack on Islamberg. In June 2017, a Tennessee man, Robert Doggart, was sentenced to almost 20 years in prison for plotting an attack on Islamberg. In January 2019, three men and one male minor were arrested for plotting an attack on Islamberg with explosives. Police found 23 firearms and three homemade bombs that investigators claim were going to be used to attack the hamlet.

See also
Holy Islamville, South Carolina
Kiryas Joel
Baladullah

References

1980s establishments in New York (state)
African-American history of New York (state)
African-American Islam
Hamlets in Delaware County, New York
Hamlets in New York (state)
Islam in New York (state)
Populated places in New York established by African Americans
Intentional communities in New York (state)